Sue is a common short form of the following female given names:

Susan
Susanna / Susannah / Suzanna
Susanne
Suzanne
Suzette

It is rarely used as a man's name, a notable example being Sue K. Hicks (1895-1980), American jurist, who may have inspired the song "A Boy Named Sue".

See also
Sue (disambiguation)
 for list of many people with given name "Sue"
Sioux

Hypocorisms